Wakanumuné is a surname. Notable people with the surname include:

Jean-Patrick Wakanumuné (born 1980), New Caledonian footballer
Joël Wakanumuné (born 1986), New Caledonian footballer, brother of Jean-Patrick
Loic Wakanumuné (born 1985), New Caledonian footballer